Kuragin is a Russian masculine surname, its feminine counterpart is Kuragina. It may refer to
Anatole Kuragin, a character in Tolstoy's novel War and Peace
Hélène Kuragina, a character in Tolstoy's novel War and Peace, sister of Anatole
Olga Kuragina (born 1959), Russian pentathlete

See also
Kurakin

Russian-language surnames